KSAM (1240 kHz, "Sports Talk 1240 - 102.7") is an AM radio station licensed to serve Whitefish, Montana.  The station is owned by Bee Broadcasting, Inc.  It airs a sports format.

All Bee Broadcasting stations are based at 2431 Highway 2 East, Kalispell.

The station was assigned these call letters by the Federal Communications Commission on November 16, 2005. This callsign had been assigned to an AM radio station in Huntsville, Texas for nearly 80 years, now known as KHVL. The FM counterpart continues to reside in Huntsville since 1965, as KSAM-FM.

Since 2017, KSAM's AM broadcasts are simulcast on 102.7 FM over translator K274CY.

Previous Logo
 (KSAM's logo under previous ESPN Radio affiliation)

References

External links
KSAM official website

SAM
ESPN Radio stations
Radio stations established in 2005
CBS Sports Radio stations